Siege of Tabriz is a military conflict during the Safavid-Ottoman war of 1603-1618. As a result of a successful siege, Tabriz was returned to the Safavid Empire after 18 years of Ottoman possession.

Resumption of war 
Although peace between the Safavid state and the Istanbul court signed in 1590 was secured, tensions persisted. In 1603, the Safavid state rebuilt its army through reforms while the Ottoman state was in crisis.

After the Peace of Istanbul, the Ottoman state experienced several uprisings and defeats on its western frontiers. The ever-increasing taxes and wars caused Jalali rebellions from 1599. During this period, the Safavid state not only restored its army, but also managed in 1598 to deliver a decisive blow to its eastern enemy - the Uzbek Khanate. It was already clear that the Ottoman state was next in line. Shah Abbas was waiting for a suitable moment.

Ottoman soldiers in Azerbaijan could not receive their salaries on time due to problems within the empire. Therefore, in protest, they began to plunder the surroundings. Ghazi Bey, the judge of Salmas, turned to Shah Abbas for help in one of these raids. In response, Shah Abbas sent him a sword and a belt along with the khan's title.

Zandzirkiran Ali Pasha, the governor of Tabriz, left a small garrison in Tabriz and marched against Gazi Bey, who had taken refuge in the fortress of Garniyaryk, in order to punish an act that he considered treason. The ottoman units in Nakhchivan also joined the movement. Although the fortress was captured, sazi Bey managed to escape and take refuge with Shah Abbas in Isfahan. After these incidents, Shah Abbas has realized that the time to recapture Tabriz had come, and on 15 August 1603, he began preparations for a campaign against Isfahan. One of his commanders, Allahverdi Khan, also ordered to go to Baghdad. Abbas I moved with his army on 14 September, and reached Kashan in the north on 17 September. In this way, he wanted to spread the image and rumor that the main goal of his campaign would be somewhere else.

When the governor of Ardabil, Zulfugar Khan, and the governor of Qazvin, Amirgun Khan, were ordered to join him with their troops, the Ottomans realized that Abbas I main goal was Tabriz. Taking Nahavand without resistance, Shah Abbas I and his army reached Tabriz on 26 September and began the siege.

Siege 
Sources report that the city had a strong garrison of 5000 riflemen, about 200 defensive guns, and a food supply for 10 years. However, for a significant part of these militants outside Tabriz it was for them, participating in the movement, to punish Gazi Bey. The garrison in Tabriz was commanded by the son of Ali Pasha.

After Tabriz came under Ottoman occupation in 1585, it suffered severe damage and most of its population left the city. Over time, thanks to peaceful situation, part of the population returned, but the Azerbaijani Turks, those who form the basis of the local population, were forbidden to wear Shiite symbols and to perform rituals. Feeling the arrival of the Kyzylbash army, the locals began to wear traditional Kyzylbash headdresses. Sensing this change in the population, the Ottoman garrison left the city and took refuge in the fortress. However, the head of the garrison could not understand who besieged the city, and sent a message to his father, thinking that the besiegers were marauders.

Shah Abbas I firstly managed to introduce several militants from his units into the city. These warriors managed to quietly kill the guards. Meanwhile, another 500 warriors entered the city as merchants. After these soldiers opened the gates of the castle, where the guards were supposed to stand, 6000 selected soldiers attacked. Clashes between the two armies began inside the city.

Realizing that the fortress was besieged by the Safavid army, the commander sent information to his father Ali Pasha and asked for help. On 28 September 1603, Ali Pasha, having received the news that the Safavid army was in front of Tabriz, and returning from his campaign against the fortress of Karniyarik, faced the Safavid army of about 15000 people in the Azbant region near Sufiyan, northwest of Tabriz. The Ottoman army, which was small in number, suffered a major defeat in this battle.

With this victory, the Safavid army ended the hopes of the Ottoman army besieged in Tabriz. In order to break their resistance, the Safavid side offered them a double salary, and the number of those who accepted this offer increased every day. In the end, the Ottoman army surrendered on 21 October 1603.

Following events 
Locals killed Ottoman soldiers to compensate the oppression during the occupation of 1585-1586. The liberation of the city of Tabriz, where the Safavid state founded its first capital, was greeted with great joy throughout the empire.

Along with the recapture of Tabriz, the most important city in the region, the Safavid state also liberated the Ordubad, Julfa, Maku, Salmas, Khoy, Maragin, Nakhchivan and Javanshir regions in a short time.

Both before and after the war, Shah Abbas pursued an active foreign policy in order to find allies against the Ottoman Empire. During his reign, a large delegation was sent to Europe twice.

Having recaptured Tabriz, on 15 November, he received George Tekthander, the ambassador of the Holy Roman Emperor Rudolf II, who had been at war with the Ottomans since 1593. The envoy presented to the tsar the letters of the emperor, written in Italian and Latin, as well as the letter of the Moscow prince.

References 

1600s in the Ottoman Empire
Ottoman–Persian Wars
1603 in Asia
Tabriz
History of Tabriz
17th century in Iran
Tabriz
Tabriz